The 1902 Ohio State Buckeyes football team was an American football team that represented Ohio State University during the 1902 college football season. The Buckeyes compiled a 6–2–2 record and outscored their opponents by a combined total of 172 to 136 in their first season under head coach Perry Hale.

Schedule

References

Ohio State
Ohio State Buckeyes football seasons
Ohio State Buckeyes football